Bıçaqçı (also, Bychagchy, Pichakchy, Pichakhchi, and Pichakhchy) is a village and municipality in the Zardab Rayon of Azerbaijan.  It has a population of 1,608.

Notable natives 

 Melik Maharramov — Hero of the Soviet Union.

References 

Populated places in Zardab District